Ivan Mandov (born 18 February 1951) is a Bulgarian former sports shooter. He competed at the 1972 Summer Olympics and the 1980 Summer Olympics.

References

1951 births
Living people
Bulgarian male sport shooters
Olympic shooters of Bulgaria
Shooters at the 1972 Summer Olympics
Shooters at the 1980 Summer Olympics
People from Sopot, Plovdiv Province
20th-century Bulgarian people